Swami Krishnananda Saraswati (25 April 1922 – 23 November 2001) was a disciple of Sivananda Saraswati and served as the General Secretary of the Divine Life Society in Rishikesh, India from 1958 until 2001. Author of more than 40 texts, and lecturing extensively, on yoga, religion, and metaphysics, Krishnananda was a prolific theologian, saint, yogi and philosopher.

Krishnananda was President of the Sivananda Literature Research Institute and the Sivananda Literature Dissemination Committee.  He served as editor of the Divine Life Society’s monthly paper, Divine Life, for 20 years.

Life
Swami Krishnananda (born as Subbaraya), initiated by his mentor Swami Sivananda Saraswati, was born on 25 April 1922 into an orthodox Madhva (Shivalli Brahmin) family in Puttur, Karnataka. He learnt Sanskrit at an early age and took to reading and memorising Sanskrit works. His understanding of Hindu scriptures predisposed him towards Advaita philosophy. He yearned for spiritual learning and renunciation, however, his father persuaded him into accepting a government job at Hospet Government Training School in Bellary in 1943. He fell ill there and returned home. In 1944, he left his home to visit Sivananda Ashram in Rishikesh. He worked as an editor in the Ashram and in 1948, on Sivananda’s request, he wrote his first book Realisation of the Absolute. (note: the year 1948 in the preceding sentence is incorrect. Swami Krishnananda's Preface to The Realization of the Absolute is dated 1 August 1947. Swami Sivananda's Foreword is dated 8 September 1947).

In 1961, he became the general secretary of Divine Life Society. He spent his life in the Ashram giving lectures and writing over 40 books on philosophy, Hindu scriptures, yoga, meditation, mysticism and poetry till his death on 23 November 2001.

Philosophy

Vedanta
Swami Krishnananda valued and was a scholar of Western philosophy and was also an exponent of Advaita Vedanta philosophy, the most influential sub-school of Vedanta.

Yoga
Swami Krishnananda taught and practiced Yoga of Synthesis, which combines the four main paths of the discipline - Karma Yoga, Bhakti Yoga, Raja Yoga, and Jnana Yoga.

Books
Saraswati wrote many books, published by the DLS. Among them were Mundaka Upanishad and The Tree of Life.

Footnotes

Further reading

 Chidananda, S.; Gunasekaran, K.J.A.; Hridayananda, S.; Keikens, Narayan; Krishnamurthy, V.; Krishnananda, S.; Madhavananda, S.; Mandali, Matru; Naik, B.R.; Nath, Dr. Bharat Chandra; Narayanananda, S.; Prasad, Ganesh; Randev, Prof. Vasudav; Rao, Seshagiri; Sachdev, Medha; Sahai, Baldeo; Sinha, D.M.; Sivachidananda, S.; Sivananda, S.; Tushar, Chattopadhyay; Vandana, Mataji; Viveka, Mataji; Yagnavalkyananandaji, S.; (1999) A Messenger of Peace and Wisdom. Rishikesh: Yoga Vedanta Forest Academy Press.
 Divine Life (2001). "Swami Krishnananda Attains Mahasamadhi" Divine Life. December 2001: pp. 1–5
 
 
 Krishnananda, Swami. A Sacramental Life. Rishikesh: Yoga Vedanta Forest Academy Press. 2004
 Krishnananda, Swami. An Introduction to the Philosophy of Yoga. Rishikesh: Y.V.F.A. Press. 3rd ed. 2000 
 Krishnananda, Swami. My Life. Rishikesh: Y.V.F.A. Press. 1998

1922 births
2001 deaths
20th-century Hindu philosophers and theologians
20th-century Hindu religious leaders
20th-century Indian philosophers
Advaitin philosophers
Devotees of Krishna
Indian Hindu saints
Indian Hindu spiritual teachers
Indian yoga teachers
Indian magazine editors
Indian religious writers
Indian theologians
Modern yoga gurus
Writers from Karnataka
People from Rishikesh
People from Dakshina Kannada district
Tulu people